Héctor Orlando Medina Díaz (born January 27, 1975 in Trujillo) is a retired Honduran football goalkeeper.

Club career
Nicknamed 'La Figura',  Medina played for Olimpia, Broncos, Universidad, Real España and Vida in the Honduran National League. He was sold along with Camilo Bonilla, Modesto Rodas, Walter Argueta and Jeffrey Brooks from Vida to Honduran Second Division outfit Unión Ájax due to a financial crisis in Vida. He then had another two seasons at Real Juventud.

International career
Medina made his debut for Honduras in a November 1998 friendly match against Guatemala and has earned a total of 14 caps, scoring no goals. He has represented his country in 2 FIFA World Cup qualification matches.

His final international was a February 2006 friendly match against China.

Retirement
In October 2010 he became goalkeeper coach at the Honduras U-17 national team.
In July 2011 Medina was announced as goalkeeper coach at Atlético Choloma but was dismissed in February 2013.

References

External links

1975 births
Living people
People from Colón Department (Honduras)
Association football goalkeepers
Honduran footballers
Honduras international footballers
C.D. Olimpia players
C.D. Federal players
Real C.D. España players
C.D.S. Vida players
C.D. Real Juventud players
Liga Nacional de Fútbol Profesional de Honduras players
Central American Games gold medalists for Honduras
Central American Games medalists in football